Oak Grove is an unincorporated community in Durham County, North Carolina, United States, off North Carolina Highway 98.

External links
 Oak Grove at the U.S. Geographic Names Information System

Unincorporated communities in Durham County, North Carolina
Unincorporated communities in North Carolina